The  was a Japanese law enacted on April 22, 1925, with the aim of allowing the Special Higher Police to more effectively suppress socialists and communists. In addition to criminalizing forming an association with the aim of altering the kokutai ("national essence") of Japan, the law also explicitly criminalized criticism of the system of private property, and became the centerpiece of a broad apparatus of thought control in Imperial Japan. Altogether more than 70,000 people were arrested under the provisions of the Peace Preservation Law between 1925 and its repeal by American Occupation authorities in 1945.

Passage

Following the Russian Revolution of 1917, socialist and communist ideas began spreading in Japan, and the government became increasingly concerned that socialism and communism represented a threat to the emperor system and Japan's divine kokutai (国体, "national essence"). The 1918 Rice Riots and the assassination of Prime Minister Hara Kei only deepened concerns that dangerous ideas were spreading through society. Efforts to pass a Peace Preservation Law began within the Diet as early as 1921, and gathered momentum after the formation of the Japan Communist Party in 1922, although opposition to the law remained strong. Finally, the law was passed in 1925, in conjunction with the passage of the Universal Manhood Suffrage Law, which allowed all male citizens to vote in elections, regardless of wealth or status. Fears that newly enfranchised working-class voters might vote for socialists or communists played an important role in overcoming earlier opposition to the law.

Provisions

The law provided:

 Anyone who has formed an association with the aim of altering the kokutai or the system of private property, and anyone who has joined such an association with full knowledge of its object, shall be liable to imprisonment with or without hard labor, for a term not exceeding ten years. 

By using the highly vague and subjective term kokutai, the law attempted to blend politics and ethics, but the result was that any political opposition could be branded as "altering the kokutai". Thus the government had carte blanche to outlaw any form of dissent.

Consequences

In 1927, a sub-bureau, the "Thought Section," was established within the Criminal Affairs Bureau of the Special Higher Police within the Home Ministry in order to make use of the new legal authority granted by the Peace Preservation Law to ferret out and suppress subversive ideologies. The new "Thought Police" established local branches throughout Japan as well as in Japan's overseas territories to monitor dangerous thoughts and ideologies among Japan's imperial subjects. A "Student Section" was also established within the Ministry of Education to monitor subversive thought among university professors and students. Within the Ministry of Justice, special  were appointed to suppress .

Renewed underground activity by the banned Japan Communist Party in 1928 led to the March 15 incident, in which police arrested more than 1,600 Communists and suspected Communists under the provisions of the Peace Preservation Law. The same year, the highly anti-Communist government of Tanaka Giichi pushed through an amendment to the law, raising the maximum penalty from ten years to death.

By 1933, coerced "ideological conversions" (転向, tenkō) had become the main means of enforcing the Peace Preservation Law, rather than judicial punishment. In order to elicit tenkō from prisoners suspected of ideological radicalism, the police employed physical torture, as well as psychological torture and familial pressure.

In the 1930s, with Japan's increasing militarism and totalitarianism, dissent was tolerated less and less. In early February 1941, the original Peace Preservation Law of 1925 was heavily amended to make punishments even more severe. Terms for people suspected of socialist and communist sympathies were made harsher, and for the first time religious organizations were included within the purview of the Thought Police. In addition, the appeals court for thought crimes was abolished, and the Ministry of Justice given the right to appoint defense attorneys in cases of thought crime. The new provisions became effective on May 15, 1941.

From 1925 through 1945, over 70,000 people were arrested under the provisions of the Peace Preservation Law, but only about 10% reached trial, and the death penalty was imposed on only two offenders, spy Richard Sorge and his informant, Hotsumi Ozaki. The Peace Preservation Law was repealed following the end of World War II by the American occupation authorities. The repeal was effected on October 15, 1945.

References

Further reading
 Minichiello, Sharon. Retreat from Reform: Patterns of Political Behavior in Interwar Japan (University of Hawaii Press, 1984).
 Mitchell, Richard H. "Japan's Peace Preservation Law of 1925: Its Origins and Significance." Monumenta Nipponica (1973): 317–345. online
 Mitchell, Richard H. Thought Control in Prewar Japan, Cornell University Press, 1976

1925 in law
Anti-communism in Japan
Legal history of Japan
Political repression in Japan
Politics of the Empire of Japan
Japanese legislation